Senator Maldonado may refer to:

Abel Maldonado (born 1967), California State Senate
Héctor Martínez Maldonado (born 1968), Senate of Puerto Rico